William Pallister (1884 – after 1904) was an English footballer who made 60 appearances in the Football League playing for Sunderland and Lincoln City. He played at left back.

References

1884 births
Year of death missing
Footballers from Gateshead
English footballers
Association football fullbacks
Sunderland A.F.C. players
Lincoln City F.C. players
English Football League players
Place of death missing